A porcupine is a mammal best known for its coat of sharp spines, or quills, that provides a defense from predators.

Porcupine may also refer to:

Biology
Porcupine caribou, a subspecies of the caribou also called Grant's caribou
Porcupine flower, a plant from India
Porcupinefish, also commonly called blowfish
 Porcupine, a protein encoded by the PORCN gene

Places
Porcupine Mountains, Michigan
Porcupine Hills, Manitoba and Saskatchewan
Porcupine Hills Formation, Alberta

Bodies of water 
Porcupine River, a river with its source in the Yukon that flows through Alaska
Porcupine River (British Columbia), a tributary of the Stikine River in British Columbia
Porcupine Creek, also known historically as the Porcupine River, a tributary of the Skagway River in Alaska
Porcupine Bank, an area of seabed on the Irish shelf
Porcupine Seabight, a deep-water basin in the Porcupine Bank
Porcupine Abyssal Plain, an abyssal plain adjacent to the Irish continental margin

Parks 
Porcupine Provincial Forest, Saskatchewan
Porcupine Provincial Forest (Manitoba), Manitoba
Porcupine Flat Campground
Porcupine Gorge National Park
Porcupine Meadows Provincial Park, British Columbia

Towns

Australia 
 Porcupine, Queensland, a locality in the Shire of Flinders

Canada 
 Porcupine, Ontario, a neighbourhood of Timmins
 Rural Municipality of Porcupine No. 395, Saskatchewan
 Porcupine Plain, Saskatchewan

United States 
Porcupine, North Dakota
Porcupine, South Dakota
Porcupine, Wisconsin

Other uses
 Porcupine (album), by Echo & the Bunnymen
 Porcupine (Cheyenne) (c. 1848-1929), a chief and medicine man
 Porcupine (comics), a fictional Marvel Comics character
 The Porcupine, a 1992 novel by Julian Barnes
 
 
 AJS Porcupine, a racing motorcycle
 Porcupine Freedom Festival
 Porcupine Gold Rush
 A mascot of the Libertarian Party of the United States
 A participant in the Free State Project, an American political movement
 A nickname given to Larry Fine of The Three Stooges
 A nickname given to the 427 Chevrolet big-block